Dolly Unachukwu  (born 1 November 1969) is a Nigerian actress, producer, writer, and director. She came to national prominence as Fadake Akin-Thomas in the TV series Fortunes.

Life and career
Born in 1969 to a family of seven, Unachukwu started her acting career at the age of 16. A native of Amichi in Anambra state, she first appeared in a junior television drama in 1985 as a secretary. Later that year she was cast in the prime time soap opera Mirror in the Sun as Prisca. Unachukwu attended the Jos Television College Jos in Plateau State, where she received a diploma in Television Production in 1988. She later went on to study phonetics in 1989 at the FRCN Training school Lagos and then went to the Lagos State University in 1990 and earned a diploma in Law.

She landed her breakthrough role in Fortunes in 1993 as Fadeke, the subdued wife of a millionaire. She then made her debut in films with roles in Deadly Affair and Deadly Affair II, where she starred alongside Nollywood veterans such as; Emeka Ike, Sandra Achums and Jide Kosoko. Unachukwu played a mean pimp in the controversial film Glamour Girls, which became the most popular Nigerian film in the United States in 1995. She also appeared in the 2022 remake of Glamour Girls with Gloria Young.

In 1997, Unachukwu produced her life story, Wildest Dream. In the film, she narrated her first marriage, which ended in 1994, making her a single parent. Her estranged husband threatened to sue her over the use of his real name in the film. Unachukwu remarried in 2000 and in August of the same year moved to join her husband in England, splitting with him soon after her arrival. In England, Unachukwu began a three-year degree course in Films and Videos at the University of East London Docklands Campus in 2003, taking two years off for maternity leave in 2004. She graduated in June 2008. Unachukwu produced and directed her own film, The Empire, in 2005, while on break from the university.

Filmography
Mirror in the Sun (TV) 1986
Fortunes (TV) 1993
Deadly Affair 1995 1&2 1994
Glamour Girls 2 1996
Tears for Love 1996
Deadly Affair II 1997
Deadly Passion 1997
Wildest Dream 1997
Love without Language 1998
Brotherhood of Darkness 1998
Father Moses 1999
Full Moon 1 & 2 1999
War of Roses 2000
The Empire 2005
Sisters Love 2007

References

External links

Actresses from Lagos
1969 births
Living people
20th-century Nigerian actresses
21st-century Nigerian actresses
Lagos State University alumni
Igbo actresses
Nigerian film actresses
Nigerian film directors
Nigerian film producers
Actresses from Anambra State
Nigerian writers
Nigerian television actresses
Alumni of the University of East London